Glyptaesopus is a genus of sea snails, marine gastropod mollusks in the family Borsoniidae

Description
The small shell is slender and contains 5½ sculptured whorls with weakly incised sutures. The aperture is long and narrow and has a thin outer lip. The siphonal canal is short.

Species
Species within the genus Glyptaesopus include:
 Glyptaesopus oldroydi (Arnold, 1903) 
 Glyptaesopus phylira (Dall, 1919) 
 Glyptaesopus proctorae (M. Smith, 1936) 
 Glyptaesopus xenicus (Pilsbry & Lowe, 1932)

References

 Pilsbry and Olsson, 1941, Acad. Nat. Sci. Philadelphia. Proc. vol. 93. p. 36. 
 Radwin (1968), The Systematic Position of Glyptaesopus; The Nautilus vol. 82 (1) 
 Keen, A. M. 1971. Sea Shells of Tropical West America. Marine mollusks from Baja California to Peru, ed. 2. Stanford University Press. xv, 1064 pp., 22 pls.

External links
  Bouchet P., Kantor Yu.I., Sysoev A. & Puillandre N. (2011) A new operational classification of the Conoidea. Journal of Molluscan Studies 77: 273-308.
 

 
Gastropod genera